Travis Tomasie is an American sport shooter, a firearms instructor, and a multiple world and national IPSC and USPSA champion.

Tomasie took gold in multiple USPSA National Championships, as well as the 2008 IPSC Handgun World Shoot in the Standard division and bronze at the 2005 World Shoot in the Standard division.

In addition to serving as the captain of multiple gold medal winning US National teams, Tomasie also owns and operates a marksmanship academy.

He is a US Army Veteran and former member of the United States Army Marksmanship Unit. He has been featured and prominently starred on TV's MythBusters, Shooting USA, Gallery of Guns, and a host of other shows.

Travis is now the Pro Shooter for Masterpiece Arms.

References

External links
Official Home Page of Travis Tomasie

Living people
IPSC shooters
IPSC World Shoot Champions
1973 births